= Operation Mackerel =

Operation Mackerel was an operation carried out in World War II by the Australian Imperial Force. Three men went ashore on Java in September 1942 to collect information. They were accompanied by two members of the Dutch submarine K12. The group had difficulty during the landing as the landing boats capsized in the heavy surf, a member of group injured his back and much of the gear was lost. The mission had to be abandoned early as the captain of the submarine resurfaced in full view of the coastguard that was in communication with the Japanese. The leader of the mission deemed it to be unsafe so decided to evacuate the party.
